In phonetics, a vibrant is a class of consonant including taps and trills (a trill is "sometimes referred to as a vibrant consonant").

The term is sometimes used when it is not clear whether the rhotic (r-sound) in a language is a tap or a trill.

See also
Lateral consonant
Liquid consonant

References

Sonorant consonants